Gagik (in Western Armenian Kakig) is a common Armenian name. It may refer to:

Royalty / Nobility
Gagik I of Armenia, Bagratid king of Armenia of the Bagratuni dynasty (989–1020)
Gagik I of Vaspurakan, Artsruni ruler of Vaspurakan (908–943)
Gagik II of Armenia, the last Armenian King of Armenia of the Bagratuni dynasty (1042-1045)
Gagik of Kakheti, King of Kakheti in eastern Georgia from 1039 to 1058

Contemporary
Gagik Harutyunyan, Armenian politician, Prime Minister of Armenia 1991–1992
Gagik Hovunts, Armenian composer
Gagik Sargsyan, Armenian historian and academic
Gagik Simonyan, Armenian football player
Gagik Tsarukyan, also known by his nickname Dodi Gago, Armenian politician and businessman, founder of Prosperous Armenia party
Gago Drago, real name Gagik Harutyunyan, Armenian-Dutch welterweight kickboxer 

Armenian masculine given names